Dymer may refer to:

 Dymer, Poland
 Dymer, Kyiv Oblast, Ukraine
 Dymer (poem), by C. S. Lewis

See also
 Dimer (disambiguation)